Hanky Panky is an album by the English band the The, released in 1995. It consists of cover versions of country singer Hank Williams' songs. It reached No. 28 on the UK Albums Chart. Matt Johnson intended Hanky Panky to be the first of many albums he would record covering the work of iconic musicians. Johnson provided the liner notes to Alone and Forsaken, a compilation of Williams demos that was also released in 1995.

Production
Johnson originally planned to record an EP, and then a standard tribute album, with many musicians interpreting songs, before settling on an album of covers. Eric Schermerhorn played guitar on the album. Some songs contain only voice and harmonium. The band was more interested in retaining the meaning of the songs rather than producing musical copies of them. "Your Cheatin' Heart" was performed in a rockabilly style.

Critical reception

Entertainment Weekly wrote that "Johnson internalizes Williams' '50s despair and coughs it up as modernist melancholy." Trouser Press called the album "a tour de force tribute," writing that it "might have sunk to self-conscious gimmickry in less perceptive hands, but Johnson makes it work beautifully." The Chicago Tribune stated that it "drones with the overmiked rasp, sometime monotonous echo, and bluesy guitars that are The The's trademark."

The Independent determined that, "mostly, Hanky Panky demonstrates a misapprehension of Williams's art, the greatness of which lies, in part, in his ability to disguise darkness and loneliness in redemptively light settings." The Guardian noted that "gloomy rock replaces the original relaxed melodies, and Johnson's baritone evokes only one colour from Hank's mixed palette of emotions." The Calgary Herald concluded that "as has happened with the blues and rock in the '60s, it's taken a Brit to unearth the spirit, the soul, the songs of Hank Williams."

Track listing
All tracks by Hank Williams; arrangements/re-arrangements by Matt Johnson and D. C. Collard

"Honky Tonkin'"
"Six More Miles"
"My Heart Would Know"
"If You'll Be A Baby To Me"
"I'm A Long Gone Daddy"
"Weary Blues From Waitin'"
"I Saw the Light"
"Your Cheatin' Heart"
"I Can't Get You Off of my Mind"
"There's a Tear in My Beer"
"I Can't Escape from You"

Personnel
Matt Johnson - vocals, guitar, bass
Eric Schermerhorn - electric & slide guitar
Gail Ann Dorsey - bass
Reverend Brian McLeod - drums
Gentleman Jim Fitting - harmonica
D.C. Collard - treated melodica, arrangements

References

The The albums
1995 albums
Hank Williams tribute albums
550 Music albums
Epic Records albums